FK Rakovica is a football club based in Rakovica, Belgrade, Serbia. They compete in the Belgrade First League, the fifth tier of the national league system.

History
Founded in 1937, the club was accepted into the Belgrade Football Subassociation in 1940. They were reestablished after World War II in 1947 as Motor, before being renamed to Rakovica in 1948. In 1954, the club became known as IM Rakovica (IMR), backed by the manufacturing factory of the same name.

With the beginning of the new millennium, the club competed in the 2000–01 Second League of FR Yugoslavia, finishing bottom of the table in Group North. They subsequently suffered consecutive relegations, finding themselves in the fifth tier by the 2003–04 season.

After winning the Belgrade First League in the 2011–12 season, the club finished as runners-up of the 2012–13 Belgrade Zone League and earned promotion to the Serbian League Belgrade. They spent four seasons in the third tier, before finishing bottom of the table in 2016–17. In 2017, the club reverted its name to Rakovica.

Honours
Belgrade First League (Tier 5)
 2011–12

Notable players
For a list of all FK Rakovica players with a Wikipedia article, see :Category:FK Rakovica players.

Managerial history

References

External links
 
 Club page at Srbijasport

1937 establishments in Serbia
Association football clubs established in 1937
Football clubs in Belgrade
Rakovica, Belgrade